The 1889–90 season was Everton Football Club's second year in The Football League. The team's top goalscorer was Fred Geary.

Regular Football League First team

Such was the transition at Everton over the summer that just four of the previous season's first choice eleven, Smalley, Farmer, Holt and Chadwick remained in place, the latter being the only player to play in every Everton League game since the formation of the competition. Twenty-five-year-old right back, Andrew Hannah was brought from Renton to replace the retired George Dobson. A disappointed Nick Ross returned to Preston having missed their double winning season and was replaced by the Bolton veteran left back, Dan Doyle. Charlie Parry arrived from Chester St Oswalds, pushing James Weir out of the side and striker Frank Sugg was also pushed out as Fred Geary was brought in from Notts County. Joe Davies returned to his hometown club Chirk to be replaced by Alex Latta from Dumbarton meaning that no less than five new signings made their debut on the opening day of the season with two of them, Geary and Parry both becoming instant heroes by scoring the goals in a 3–2 victory over Blackburn.

The loss of inside right Robert Watson to Gorton Villa during the summer left a gap that wasn't properly filled until November when Alec Brady arrived from Sunderland and also scored on his debut in the 8–0 mauling of Stoke.

His arrival completed what became the first choice eleven for the season but they only actually played as a team on one occasion when, in the formation listed above, they slumped to their worst result of the entire season, losing 1–5 at home to Preston on 16 November, despite leading at half time. Their second half display that day would ultimately cost Everton the title as the two points won by Preston proved to be the margin between the two sides at the end of the season. Centre Half, George Farmer was heavily criticised for the defeat and was the only change for the next game, which Everton won 4–2 at Blackburn Rovers. He never regained his place in the side and was released at the end of the season. Farmer's and Brady's Everton careers overlapped only three games, hence the solitary appearance of the first eleven, although the other nine, along with Farmer during the first half of the season and Brady during the latter half were almost a constant, with the result that five played all twenty-two games while Holt and Latta each missed just one.

Other players used in the Football League
Bob Cain (4 appearances at centre back), Walter Cox (4 apps in goal), Harry Hammond (1 app at left back), Jimmy Jamieson (1 app at centre forward), Charles Jolliffe (1 app in goal), Robert Jones (1 app at inside right), Daniel Kirkwood (11 apps at inside right), W Orr (1 app at centre forward), Frank Sugg (1 app at centre back), James Weir (3 apps at left back)

Sugg and Weir had both been first team regulars the previous season but were edged out by new faces, the former going on to achieve greater fame as a cricketer of the highest calibre. Harry Hammond made only this one appearance for Everton before going on to narrowly miss out on winning the title with Sheffield United

NB position listed is that filled most commonly by the player during this season and may not always have been the role played.

League

Football Association Challenge Cup

Achievements
The 1889/90 team set the following club records in the League
Best ever finish = Runners up
Most points gained = 31
Most home points = 18
Most away points = 13
Most wins = 14
Same number of home wins as last season = 8
Most away wins = 6
Most draws = 3
First ever home draws = 2
Fewest defeats = 5
Fewest home defeats = 1
Fewest away defeats = 4
Most goals scored = 65
Most home goals = 40
Most away goals scored = 25
Fewest goals conceded = 40
Fewest home goals conceded = 15
Fewest away goals conceded = 25
Record League victory = 8–0 vs Stoke on 2 November 1889
Equalled Record away victory = 4–2 at Blackburn Rovers on 28 December 1889
Most hat-tricks as a team in a season = 2
Equalled most hat-tricks in a season = Fred Geary and Alex Latta, 1 each
Top League scorer in a season = Fred Geary (21 goals)
Fewest players used in a League campaign = 21
Most ever presents in a League campaign (22 games) = 5 – Hannah, Doyle, Parry, Chadwick, Milward
Most consecutive League victories = 6
Most consecutive home wins = 5
Most consecutive away wins = 5
Longest unbeaten run = 6
Longest unbeaten home run = 6
Longest unbeaten away run = 5
Longest sequence of drawn games = 2
Longest sequence of home draws = 2
completed two seasons without drawing two consecutive away games
Fewest away draws = 1
Record home defeat = 1–5 vs Preston North End on 5 November 1889
Completed two seasons without losing consecutive home games
Longest winless home run = 2
Record victory in all competitions = 11–2 vs Derby County (F A Cup) on 18 January 1890 (still stands)
Most consecutive victories in all competitions = 6

Sources
 https://web.archive.org/web/20181002023305/http://www.evertonfc.com/stats/?mode=season&era_id=1&season_id=3&seasons=3
 http://www.allfootballers.com

1889-90
English football clubs 1889–90 season